The VH series consists of  engines built from 1989 to 2001 by the Nissan Motor Corporation. The design consists of a 90-degree V8 with an aluminium cylinder block that features a closed upper deck and a deep skirt. The cylinder heads are also aluminium with a DOHC 4 valves design and pentroof combustion chambers. The production blocks and production head castings were used successfully in various forms of racing including the IRL.

VH45DE
The VH45DE is a  V8 developed by Nissan for use in the Infiniti Q45 sport luxury sedan (G50 platform) which was released in November 1989. The engine was also used in the Japanese market Nissan President limousine (JG50 platform) which debuted in late 1990.

The  VH45DE featured variable valve timing, also known as VTC, from 1990 until 1995. This was during the time that the "Gentleman's Agreement" between Japan's automotive manufacturers was in effect, requiring all cars sold in their home market to (on paper, at least) produce no more than 280 PS. Due to tightening emissions regulations in the US market, the VTC feature was dropped from the 1996 Infiniti Q45. In the following year, the VH45DE was no longer available in any US market vehicles. The engine continued on in the Japanese market until 2002 in the Nissan President limousine; power was somewhat lower in the President to make it quieter and smoother.

VH45DEs made before 1994 used plastic timing chain guides, and over time these have been known to fail. This results in a noisy valve-train and parts of the plastic guides can end up in the sump and oil pickup, resulting in engine damage. Nissan changed to metal backed chain guides from 1994 onwards. 

This engine was used in the following vehicle(s):
 1990-1996 Infiniti Q45,  at 6,000 rpm,  at 4,000 rpm
 1990-2002 Nissan President,  at 5,600 rpm,  at 4,000 rpm

The VH45DE became a relatively popular engine swap for other platforms due to being low cost to source and also able to be adapted to a Nissan manual transmission when using an aftermarket adapter plate. The VH45DE is also used in a variety of motorsports ranging from drifting to drag racing, boat racing, and dirt track sprint cars (Australia and New Zealand).

VH41DE
The VH41DE is a  V8 that was based on the VH45DE.

The VH41DE also used a double row timing chain, compared to the VH45DE that used a single row timing chain. Its alternator is also located at the top of the engine which creates an overall narrower engine package which can be handy in engine conversions where it may otherwise foul on the chassis rails.

The  VH41DE was used in the following vehicles:
 1997-2001 Infiniti Q45 , 
 1992-1996 Nissan Leopard, 
 1991-1996 Nissan Cima FY32, 
 1996-2001 Nissan Cima FY33,

See also
 Nissan VRH Racing Engines
 List of Nissan engines

References

VH
V8 engines
Gasoline engines by model